Mr. Airavata is a 2015 Indian Kannada-language action film directed and written by A. P. Arjun and produced by Sandesh Nagaraj. The film stars Darshan, Urvashi Rautela , and Prakash Raj in the lead roles and also stars Darshan's son Vineesh making his acting debut. The music was composed by V. Harikrishna.

Plot
Airavata (Darshan) serves as a good Police Officer who works for the well-being of society. The film starts with the chief minister and IG of Karnataka coming to the house of Vitta Gowda (Ananth Nag) to request that he send his grandson Airavata (Darshan) to duty as soon as possible. 

He agrees but wit favorable conditionsns. Outside, a reporter asks her senior the reason for such a fuss. Then the senior explains the story.

Six months earlier, Airavata had joined Bangalore police as the ACP. He brought over a big change to the crime-filled city and slowly eradicated all signs of criminal activity. He brings up new rules that serve the public without consulting higher officials and does these through his own money. These rules cause huge losses to several criminals, mostly to Prathap Kale (Prakash Raj), who immediately calls upon an enmity with Airavata. During this, a reporter Priya Urvashi Rautela, falls in love with Airavata and is later shown to be the girl whom he had saved previously from an accident, hence the reason for her love. Despite this, Airavata does not reciprocate her feelings. During the preparations for a government event, Airavata is arrested by the force and is revealed to be a fake IPS officer in Karnataka. He reveals his story during an open court session.

Airavata was a farmer who had gone to Bangalore to solve the problems of a few farmers. His sister Charu Sindhu Lokanath gets raped by their workers when she goes to plough the fields. A corrupt cop refused to take the family's complaint, which results in Charu's suicide. Their friend Prakasa (Bullet Prakash) kills the inspector and is shot dead in the process. Airavata vows revenge, and when Karnataka police gives a job opening in Bangalore, Airavata gets himself posted there by the wrong means. The court declares Airavata innocent and sends him back to his village. On the request of the people, Airavata writes the civil service exam and is reposted as ACP.

Now the story comes back to the present. The reporter is curious about what will be Airavata's next move. Airavata slowly begins to take down Prathaps empire once more. He also accepts Priya's love. Towards the end, Prathap kills Vitta Gowda and his wife Sitadevi Sithara and kidnaps each and every police officer's daughters along with Priya, intending to sell them abroad. Airavata arrives in the nick of time and saves them, and kills Prathap. At a felicitation ceremony, he submits his resignation form, saying that should crime rise again, then he will join the force once more. The film ends with Airavata and a child Vineesh Darshan saluting towards the screen.

Cast

 Darshan as ACP Airavata 
 Urvashi Rautela as Priya
 Prakash Raj as Prathap Kale
 Ananth Nag as Vitta Gowda
 Sithara as Sitadevi
 Vineesh Darshan
 Bullet Prakash as Prakasa
 Sindhu Lokanath as Charu
 Avinash as Commissioner
 Chikkanna as Priya's assistant
 Sadhu Kokila as Police Constable Bahubali
 Raghav Uday as Pratap Kale's henchman
 Petrol Prasanna as Pratap Kale's henchman
 Ashok
 Sanketh Kashi
 Mahek Chahal as an item number Ka Thalakatu

Production

Development
In mid February 2013, producer Sandesh Nagaraj of Sandesh Combines banner, who is also a politician, announced that he would produce a film starring Darshan and selected director A. P. Arjun upon his recommendation. It was reported that Darshan liked Arjun's work in both Ambari and Addhuri besides penning down lyrics for his own film Thangigagi. It was revealed that Darshan would be playing the role of a cop and further scripting was still in the beginning stages.

The film began production on 16 February 2013 at the Kanteerava Studios in Bangalore with the presence of former Chief Minister H. D. Kumaraswamy and actor V. Ravichandran. Titled as Airavata, the film was reported to have been lavishly invested by the producer and added that the shooting would not take place in Mysore as is the usual case with Darshan's films. However, the film's proceedings went on a very slow pace owing to the busy schedules of director Arjun, and actor Darshan.

Casting
Actress Erica Fernandes was initially roped in to play the lead role opposite Darshan. She bagged this role even before the release of her maiden Kannada film Ninnindale'''s release. She was reportedly shuffling between the sets of this film and also Buguri'' simultaneously. However, due to under weight issue differences, Erica was out of the film. Reports indicated Rachita Ram would replace her for the role, which found to be untrue. Finally, Arjun finalized Urvashi Rautela through Google, where he and the producer searched India's most beautiful girl and found her name and Urvashi Rautela's pictures. Also, she was an apt choice to feature opposite Darshan because of her striking looks and great height.

Multilingual actor Prakash Raj was signed in to play the main antagonist opposite Darshan. It was also reported that Girish Karnad and Arundhati Nag would play the role of parents to Darshan's character while Bullet Prakash was also reportedly cast for an important supporting role. In early 2015, Darshan's seven-year-old son Vineesh was reportedly roped in to play a small character role alongside his father.

Soundtrack

Track listing

References

External links
 
@MrAiravata Twitter page

2015 films
2010s police films
2015 action thriller films
2010s Kannada-language films
Indian action thriller films
Fictional portrayals of the Karnataka Police
2015 masala films
Indian police films
Films scored by V. Harikrishna
Indian courtroom films
Films shot in Switzerland
Films shot in Bangalore
Films shot in Slovenia
Films set in Karnataka
Films set in Bangalore